Formula Ford 1600 is a number of championships which cater to 1600cc, Ford Kent powered Formula Ford racing cars. The UK national Formula Ford category disbanded these cars when it adopted the 1800cc Zetec engine in 1993.  However, it has been running as several regional club championships ever since and has recently renewed success. Several cars constructed to Zetec rules have been converted to accept a Kent engine, as well as the Duratec powered cars that followed. There have also been several recent purpose-built Kent cars which have enjoyed success.

Championships
In the British Isles, several championships are in existence for this type of car. These are: Castle Combe, which races exclusively at the Wiltshire venue of the same name with classes for cars constructed after 1995, after 1990, and before 1990 with the championship winner being decided by which driver has the best results irrespective of class; Midlands-South, which is an amalgamation of the former Star of the Midlands and Motor Sport Vision championships and races at Mallory Park, Silverstone, Snetterton and Brands Hatch, with a comparable class structure to Castle Combe, except that the Pre 1990 class is divided into cars constructed between 1985 and 1990, cars constructed before 1985 and cars constructed before 1980. An identical class structure is used in the North West series which races at Oulton Park in Cheshire and Ty Croes in Anglesey. However, due to the number of competitors, races are held for cars constructed before and after 1990, with separate champions being crowned. National championships exist for the Classic championship which caters for cars manufactured between 1974 and 1982 and pre-1974. However, the championship is awarded to the driver with the best results in the 1974-1982 class, irrespective of the results of any competitor driving a car built before 1974. The Historic Sports Car Club organises a championship for cars constructed before 1971, which also features a race at Croix-en-Ternois in France. There is also the Northern Irish championship which is for cars of any age and races predominantly at Kirkistown, with additional races held at Oulton Park and Mondello Park, in the Republic of Ireland. Finally, an Irish championship is held, with the bulk of races held at Mondello Park as well as the aforementioned Kirkistown and Pembrey in Wales. An innovation within this championship is that Class A is intended for the serious championship contender, whilst Class B is for drivers competing solely for their own enjoyment, regardless of the age of their car. There is also the Scottish championship which races predominantly at Knockhill but is set to host one race weekend at Croft, it is organised by the Scottish Motor Racing Club.

An interesting element of Formula Ford 1600 racing is that a pre 1971 car is eligible for every other championship run, meaning that the driver of such a car could conceivably race every weekend if they so desired.

Trophy Events
A notable feature of the Formula Ford 1600 calendar is the presence of one-off ‘Trophy Events’. These bring together drivers, regardless of championship they contest for a series of races without any class structure. Notable examples include the Castle Combe Carnival, the Formula Ford Festival at Brands Hatch, the Edwina Overend Memory Trophy at Mallory Park and the Anglesey Circuit Club’s December Trophy. In addition, the BRDC arranges a number of races, such as the Cheshire Trophy at Oulton Park, the Chris Mudge Memorial Trophy and a race at Scotland’s Knockhill circuit; these culminate in November’s Walter Hayes Trophy at Silverstone which features up to 200 drivers, including some more famous names, such as, Neil Cunningham, Danny Watts, Steven Kane and Joey Foster.

Constructors
Despite the homogeneity of mechanicals, the number of car constructors is vast, which include; Van Diemen, Swift, Mygale, Reynard, Vector, Crossle, Royale, Hawke, Mallock, Merlyn, Palliser, Macon, Lotus, Elden, Lola, Brabham, Titan, Jamun and Nike.

References

Formula racing
Motorsport in the United Kingdom